Isidro Ayora Canton is a canton of Ecuador, located in the Guayas Province.  Its capital is the town of Isidro Ayora.  Its population at the 2001 census was 8,226.

Demographics
Ethnic groups as of the Ecuadorian census of 2010:
Mestizo  55.5%
Montubio  32.4%
Afro-Ecuadorian  9.0%
White  2.9%
Indigenous  0.1%
Other  0.1%

References

Cantons of Guayas Province